FTUB may refer to:

 Federation of Trade Unions of Belarus
 Federation of Trade Unions of Burma